Prunus wilsonii is a species of Prunus native to southeast China, preferring to grow at 950–2500m. It is a deciduous tree reaching a height of 10–30m.

Uses

Wood from Prunus wilsonii was used to carve the Shakyamuni (Shaka Nyorai) (木造釈迦如来立像; mokuzō shaka nyorai ryūzō), a copy of the lost Udayana Buddha by the Chinese sculptors (and brothers) Zhāng Yánjiǎo and Zhāng Yánxí. It was brought to Japan from China in 986 by the monk Chōnen (奝然).

References

External links

wilsonii
Bird cherries
Endemic flora of China
Plants described in 1905